Martin Lake Power Plant is a 2,250-megawatt coal power plant located southwest of Tatum, Texas, in Rusk County, Texas. The plant is owned by Luminant. It began operations in 1977. The plant is also served by the Luminant owned Martin Lake Line, shuttling coal from nearby as well as the Powder River Basin in Wyoming via BNSF.

History
The plant consists of three units. Unit 1 was commissioned in 1977, Unit 2 in 1978, and Unit 3 in 1979. All three, when first activated, had a capacity of 750 MW. Plans for a fourth, 858 MW coal unit at Martin Lake was formally cancelled in 1986. A man-made lake was created for the plant's cooling source. Martin Lake was retrofitted with selective catalytic reduction (SCR) systems by Fluor in 2008 to reduce nitrogen oxide emissions.

Martin Lake receives its energy from nearby lignite mines and coal from the Powder River Basin in Wyoming. Martin Lake used to receive lignite from Oak Hill Mine in nearby Rusk and Panola Counties until its closure in December 2016.

One of Martin Lake's units was idled in September 2013 due to low electricity prices. The unit was restarted in March 2014 as electricity prices rose during the 2014 North American cold wave.

Incidents
In February 2017, a contractor died in an accident at the site.

See also
 List of largest power stations in the United States
 List of power stations in Texas

References

External links
 Luminant page for Martin Lake Power Plant

Energy infrastructure completed in 1977
Energy infrastructure completed in 1978
Energy infrastructure completed in 1979
Coal-fired power stations in Texas
Buildings and structures in Rusk County, Texas
Vistra Corp